Aspergillus novoguineensis is a species of fungus in the genus Aspergillus. It is from the Cervini section. The species was first described in 2016. It has been reported to produce an asparvenone, sclerotigenin, and terremutin.

References 

novoguineensis
Fungi described in 2016